Terror Stories is a 2012 terror omnibus film made up of four short films by five South Korean directors.

A high school student is kidnapped by a killer and has her life on the line. To survive, she tells him the scariest stories she knows; starting with "Don't Answer to the Door", a story of eerie things happening in a house with a brother and sister who are waiting for their mother, "Endless Flight" in which a flight attendant and a serial killer are left alone in an airplane up in the air, "Secret Recipe" a cruel 2012 version of a folktale in which two stepsisters fight to marry a wealthy cannibalistic man, and "Ambulance on the Death Zone" in which the survivors in a city filled with a deadly zombie virus suspect each other of being infected while riding together in an ambulance.

Terror Stories was the opening film of the 2012 Puchon International Fantastic Film Festival.

Stories

Beginning
Plot
 A high school student named Ji-won is kidnapped by a serial killer with a speech impediment. The killer can only go to sleep when he listens to scary stories or when he tastes blood. In order to not get killed, Ji-won Scheherazade-like begins telling him the four scariest stories she knows. 
Directed by Min Kyu-dong
Kim Ji-won as Ji-won
Yoo Yeon-seok as the killer

Don't Answer to the Door
Plot
 Based on the Korean folktale The Sun and the Moon about a tiger who gobbles up and impersonates the mother of a young boy and his sister. A sister and brother are waiting for their mom to get home. However, their mother is late and the girl begins to get caught up in her own imagination. A suspicious delivery man knocks on the door, and the siblings try not to open it. (lit. The Sun and the Moon)
Directed by Jung Bum-sik 
Kim Hyun-soo as Sun-Yi
No Kang-min as Moon-Yi
Ra Mi-ran as mother
Lee Dong-kyu as fired employee
No Hyeon-hee as English teacher  
Kim Tae-woo
Kim Bo-kyung as Seon-yi's mother (voice)
 Lee Chae-kyung as Ghost, elder sister

Endless Flight
Plot
 A flight attendant faces a serial killer alone, while the airplane is flying at an altitude of 30,000 feet. (lit. The Horror Plane)
Directed by Im Dae-woong 
Choi Yoon-young as flight attendant So-jung
Jin Tae-hyun as serial killer Doo-ho 
Woo Hyeon as captain
Jin Yong-Wook as Detective Oh
Jung Mi-Nam as Detective Kang
Kim Ki-Cheon as Pilot
Cha Jung-Won as Min-Joo

Secret Recipe
Plot
 Based on the well-known Korean folktale Kongjwi and Patjwi, another variant of Cinderella. Gong-ji is getting married soon to Min, a rich and handsome bachelor. But she feels anxious due to her stepsister Baek-ji's severe jealousy. Wanting Min for herself, Baek-ji undergoes plastic surgery to look like Gong-ji. What they don't know is Min's secret to maintain his young face. Meanwhile, Min watches all of this, amused. (lit. Kongjwi and Patjwi)
Directed by Hong Ji-young 
Nam Bo-ra as Baek-ji 
Jung Eun-chae as Gong-ji 
Bae Soo-bin as Min 
Na Young-hee as Bak-ji's mother
Im Seong-min as housemaid

Ambulance on the Death Zone
Plot
Among the five survivors inside an ambulance escaping at full speed from a horde of berserker zombies are a doctor, a nurse, an unconscious child and her mother. The young girl is found to have an unknown scar on her wrist, and the military doctor believes that she was infected by a zombie epidemic. However, the test comes back negative, but the doctor isn't buying it. In the ensuring chaos that follows, which the doctor tries to throw the girl off the ambulance, the driver accidentally swerves off the road, and the doctors uses the chance to take his gun out and attempt to shoot the girl. However, the nurse ends up shooting him. However,the gunshot attracts a horde of zombies which begin chasing them. everyone manages to survive and get on, but the zombies catch up and kill the doctor. The mom, still insistent that her daughter isn't bitten, tries to prevent the nurse from throwing her daughter off, the nurse beginning to believe that the girl's infected. However,the driver is bit, and accidentally shot by the mom after a brief struggle for the gun. The mom succeeds in shooting the nurse out of the car, which kills her. Coming the next morning, the girl and mom embrace, the girl not having been bitten after all. But the mom was bitten during the struggle, and turns in front of her daughter. (lit. The Ambulance)
Directed by Kim Gok and Kim Sun 
Kim Ji-young as Hyun-soo's mother
Kim Ye-won as nurse
Jo Han-cheol as army doctor
Park Jae-woong as ambulance driver

Sequels

A sequel, Terror Stories 2, using the same omnibus format but with a completely different cast, was released in 2013.
A final sequel, Terror Stories 3, was released in 2016.

References

External links
 

South Korean horror anthology films
South Korean zombie films
2012 films
2012 horror films
Films about cannibalism
Films based on South Korean webtoons
2010s South Korean films